Agapanthia cardui is a species of flat-faced longhorn beetle belonging to the family Cerambycidae, subfamily Lamiinae.

Description

Subspecies
Several subspecies of A. cardui are recorded in the entomological literature:
Agapanthia cardui consobrina Chevrolat, 1840 
Agapanthia cardui marginalis (Mulsant), 1839 
Agapanthia cardui nigroaenea (Mulsant), 1839
Agapanthia cardui peragalloi (Mulsant), 1862 
Agapanthia cardui ruficornis (Pic) Pesarini & Sabbadini, 2004

Distribution
This beetle is present in most of Europe, in the Near East, and in the eastern Palearctic realm. In 2010, it was listed as occurring in 24 European countries. It has since expanded into the UK; the first specimens were recorded from East Kent in May 2018.

Diet and habitat
Agapanthia cardui are polyphagous in herbaceous plants, mainly feeding on Carduus nutans (hence the specific name) and Silybum marianum, as well as on Salvia, Urtica and Cirsium species.

References

External links
Biolib
Cerambyx
Fauna Europaea

cardui
Beetles of Europe
Beetles described in 1767
Taxa named by Carl Linnaeus